Acanthomeniidae is a family of solenogaster, a shell-less worm-like mollusk.

Genera
 Acanthomenia Thiele, 1913
 Amboherpia Handl & Salvini-Plawen, 2002
 Veromenia Gil Mansilla, Garcia Alvarez & Urgorri, 2008

References

 Salvini-Plawen L v. (1978). Antarktische und subantarktische Solenogastres (eine Monographie: 1898-1974). Zoologica (Stuttgart) 128: 1-305
 García-Álvarez O. & Salvini-Plawen L.v. (2007). Species and diagnosis of the families and genera of Solenogastres (Mollusca). Iberus 25(2): 73-143.
 García-Álvarez O., Salvini-Plawen L.v., Urgorri V. & Troncoso J.S. (2014). Mollusca. Solenogastres, Caudofoveata, Monoplacophora. Fauna Iberica. 38: 1-294.

External links
 Gil-Mansilla, E., Garcia-Alvarez, O. & Urgorri, V. 2008. New Acanthomeniidae (Solenogastres, Cavibelonia) from the abyssal Angola Basin. In: Martinez Arbizu, P. & Brix, S. (Eds) Bringing Light into Deep-sea Biodiversity. Zootaxa, 1866: 175- 186

Solenogastres